The 1922–23 season was the 14th in the history of the Isthmian League, an English football competition.

Clapton were champions, winning their second Isthmian League title. West Norwood resigned from the league at the end of the season and joined the Athenian League for 1924–25 season.

League table

References

Isthmian League seasons
I